Atefeh Nabavi is an Iranian student activist. In November 2009, she was sentenced to four years in prison for participating in post-election protests. She is the first woman to be sentenced for participating in protests in the aftermath of the disputed Iranian election.

She was freed in May, 2012, after nearly three full years in prison.

References

Living people
Iranian activists
Year of birth missing (living people)
Place of birth missing (living people)